"Black Friday" is the eleventh episode of the horror black comedy series Scream Queens. It premiered on December 1, 2015 on Fox. The episode was directed by Bradley Buecker and written by Ryan Murphy, Brad Falchuk, and Ian Brennan. In this episode, The Red Devils attempt to crash The Chanels' shopping spree in celebration of their favorite holiday, Black Friday. As the Kappa Kappa Tau girls conclude that Dean Munsch (Jamie Lee Curtis) is the Devil, they make several attempts to kill her. Meanwhile, someone else confesses to being the murderer.

The episode was watched by 2.40 million viewers and received positive reviews from critics.

Plot

After the events of the Thanksgiving where Gigi (Nasim Pedrad)'s head was served as the main dish, everyone is still in shock. Wes (Oliver Hudson), Pete (Diego Boneta), and Grace (Skyler Samuels) go to the police station to report the incident, but Detective Chisolm (Jim Clock) revealed that the entire police department has been fired due to wasting resources, and he himself will be transitioning to furniture related job, something he is happy with. Regardless of the events, Chanel (Emma Roberts) explains that Black Friday is her favorite holiday, where she buys forgettable, cheap presents for her friends and good ones for herself. She also explains how every year she bribes the store's worker to open the store earlier for her so she can buy all the things from the sale and leave only one in the display, thus leaving the people who have been waiting for the store to open angry and devastated, all just for her joy. She is about to go to the mall when Dean Munsch (Jamie Lee Curtis) stops her and the other Chanels. They insist on going though, and after a heated speech by Chanel explaining why she loves the holiday so much and pointing out how there's nothing they can currently do about the situation, Dean Munsch desists.

At the mall, The Red Devil shows up. The Devil turns off all the lights and manages to trap the Chanels inside. The other Chanels escape, but Chanel stays behind to face it, thinking the Devil is Dean Munsch. She ends up getting shot with a crossbow. She survives after Denise Hemphill (Niecy Nash) and a mall cop come to the rescue for a showdown with the Red Devil. Denise explains to Chanel that she is promoted to police chief. However, while she is talking, her henchman gets shot by the Red Devil, and alarmed, she chases after the masked killer. After the entire incident, the Chanels, Zayday, and Grace have a meeting about how they could protect each other from getting killed while everybody thinks that the murderer is Dean Munsch except Zayday (Keke Palmer). Chanel has the idea to kill Dean Munsch, though Zayday disapproves. Grace unexpectedly agrees with Chanel and they both have the idea to poison Dean Munsch.

Chanel and Grace meet up with the Dean at her house pretending that they, particularly Chanel, wants to make amends with Cathy. They present her with apple cider, knowing it is her favorite beverage. Unbeknownst to her, they put blowfish venom in it, supposedly enough to kill several people. Dean Munsch drinks it all, and doesn't even feel slightly ill. Instead, she gave Chanel and Grace an essay assignment about the university. Chanel is baffled as to how Dean Munsch survived this, but later, the Chanels hatch another plan. Grace and Pete are discussing Grace's and the girls' plan to kill Dean Munsch. They discuss it while making out, and Pete disagrees with her plan to kill someone just as Grace stops him from going too far, as she isn't ready to have sex yet. After the talk, she decides to quit the mission. In turn, Zayday also changes her mind from her previous statement, thinking killing Dean Munsch is the right thing to do. Chanel then kicks Grace out of the sorority. Wes and Pete research information about Gigi and find out her birth name was Jess Meyer, and that she is the sister of Amy Meyer (Chelsea Ricketts), the girl from the 1995 flashback who holds Sophia's (McKaley Miller) baby. It is also revealed that Amy committed suicide due to the stress of the event and Gigi then took care of the baby after Amy's suicide. Wes tells Grace about this discovery.

Meanwhile, Chad (Glen Powell) brings Pete to the Dickie Dollar Scholars house and reveals that Boone (Nick Jonas) left most of his possessions to Pete, despite the fact that they barely knew each other. Chad suspects that Boone and Pete were lovers. However, Pete admits that Boone was his source for a story about the negative effects of the  College Greek system. It was revealed here that Pete was trying to pledge The Dickie Dollar Scholars, but got rejected by Chad, Earl Grey (Lucien Laviscount), Roger (Aaron Rhodes), Dodger (Austin Rhodes), and Caulfield (Evan Paley) because he doesn't fit their criteria. He was deemed the worst Dollar Scholars pledge ever, explaining Pete's hatred to the College Greek system. In response to Boone's friendship, Chad decides to offer Pete membership to the Dickie Dollar Scholars since all of the other members have either left campus or been murdered. Pete refuses and leaves an enraged Chad at the house.

The girls decide to freeze Dean Munsch to death using a cryotherapy chamber. Dean Munsch agrees to try cryotherapy with them, and while she's in the chamber, Chanel sets it below zero for 30 minutes. When Chanel opens the door, Dean Munsch is shown covered in ice, still alive. Chanel comes up with one last idea to drown her. She gave the Chanels' and Zayday new smartphones. She will use this to call them when she thinks it's the right time to kill her. Chanel #3, and 6 are in the mall with Chanel #5 asking the store's worker to change an underwear size tag to another, which is impossible. Their cellphones rings as they argue. Chanel nervously waits in the pool as her call doesn't get an answer. The Dean arrives, and after Chanel gives some unconvincing answers to the Dean's questions, she get suspicious and puts Chanel on risk. At the end of the episode, Grace visits Pete's room and tells Pete she's finally ready to have sex with him. Pete refuses, telling her he doesn't want her first time to be with a murderer, shocking her and ending the episode.

Reception

Ratings
"Black Friday" was watched live by 2.41 million U.S. viewers and got a 0.9/3 rating/share in the 18-49 adult demographic

Critical reception
"Black Friday" received positive reviews from critics. LaToya Ferguson from The A.V. Club gave the episode a B, citing "But “Black Friday” is also probably the last bit of “fun” these characters will have before the finale, so it’s at least a good thing that this is a very funny episode and, for the first time all season, no one is the weak link." Sarene Leeds from The Wall Street Journal stated that "I didn’t think it was possible for “Scream Queens” to stretch itself any thinner in its debut season, but congratulations, Ryan Murphy, you’ve done it again." Patrick Sproull of the Den of Geek said "Black Friday tried to deliver some solid development and teasing in the B-plot alongside the fluffy main action." IGN's Amber Dowling gave the episode 8.0 out of 10, stating "The series continued to cleverly play with common horror tropes. By the closing moments it was Jamie Lee Curtis who stood out most, however, killing it in a way that only she can."

References

External links
 

2015 American television episodes
Scream Queens (2015 TV series) episodes